Mostafa Shaban (born 19 May 1970, in Cairo) is an Egyptian actor.

He is one of the current leading male actors in the Egyptian cinema.

Filmography

Film

Al-Zoga Al-Raba'a (The Fourth Wife) - 2012
Al 3ar - 2011
Code 36 (Code 36) - 2007.
juba
Fatah Enek (Open Your Eyes) - 2006.
Ahlam Omrena (Dreams of our lives) - 2005.
Mafia - 2002.
Khali el Demagh Sahee (Keep it Awake) - 2002.
El Naáma wal Taous (The Ostrich & the Peacock) - 2002.
 Ailat Alhag Mitwali (Mitwali's Family) - 2002
Sekout Hansawar (Hshh- We're rolling) - 2001.
Amil alf wouahed (Mosalsal)

Series 
Abou Gabal ابو جبل
 Ayoob
 Allahom Eny Sayeeem
 Abu El Banat
 Mawlana El-aasheq
 Amrad Nesaa
 Mazag El Kheir
 Al Zoga Al Raba'a
 Al A'ar
Nassim Errooh

References

External links
IMDB profile of Mostapha Chaaban, sometimes credited as Mostafa Shaaban
Official Website

1970 births
Living people
Egyptian male film actors